Dustin Jacoby (born April 4, 1988) is an American mixed martial artist and kickboxer who currently competes in the Ultimate Fighting Championship. In kickboxing, he has competed for GLORY, and in MMA, he has competed also for Bellator, World Series of Fighting, and Titan FC. He has fought as both a Light Heavyweight and a Middleweight. On November 1, 2018, he was ranked as the #8 middleweight kickboxer in the world by Combat Press. As of March 13, 2023, he is #14 in the UFC light heavyweight rankings.

Background
Jacoby was born in Fort Morgan, Colorado and grew up in Colorado. Dustin has a twin brother Darren, who is a former professional mixed martial artist. The brothers begun training taekwondo at the age of four, both picking up wrestling a year later. Dustin trained taekwondo for four years but continued to wrestle until the family moved to Illinois when the brothers were 12.

In Illinois Jacoby started playing basketball, claiming all-state honors while attended Triopia High School. Also playing football in the high school, Dustin had many Division I scholarship offers for both sports but due to a severe knee injury sustained during his senior year many of the offers were withdrawn. Subsequently Jacoby selected Culver-Stockton College where he played football two years as a quarterback while studying business management, before transferring to Quincy University.

Kickboxing career

GLORY World Series
Jacoby was a last-minute replacement for professional boxer Manuel Quezada at the Road to GLORY USA Light Heavyweight (209 lbs.) Tournament in Tulsa, Oklahoma. He had never competed in a professional kickboxing match before the tournament. He pulled off a major upset, knocking out International Sport Karate Association Heavyweight Champion Randy Blake, fellow mixed martial artist Roy Boughton and 19–0 prospect Brian Collette en route to winning the Tournament Championship. He earned a check for $20,000 and a one-year contract with Glory World Series.

He lost to Michael Duut by TKO after being knocked down three time in round one at GLORY 5: London in London, England on March 23, 2013.

Jacoby fought at GLORY 9: New York: 2013 95kg Slam in New York City, New York on June 22, 2013. Rematching Brian Collette in the quarter-finals, he took a close majority decision win. He then faced Danyo Ilunga in the semis and put up a good fight early, but fell behind in rounds two and three as he was hacked at with leg kicks and lost a unanimous decision.

He was set to fight Makoto Uehara at GLORY 12: New York: Lightweight World Championship Tournament in New York City on November 23, 2013 but the fight was switched to GLORY 13: Tokyo: Welterweight World Championship Tournament in Tokyo, Japan on December 21, 2013. He lost to Uehara by split decision.

He was set to face Robert Thomas in the semifinals of the GLORY 14: Zagreb in Zagreb, Croatia on March 8, 2014 but Thomas withdrew for undisclosed reasons and was replaced by Alex Pereira.

Mixed martial arts career

Early career
During a college offseason, Jacoby took an amateur mixed martial arts bout and got hooked to the sport immediately. After the college he started training at Finney's HIT Squad and turned professional after racking up an amateur record of 9-1.

Ultimate Fighting Championship
Jacoby was expected to make his UFC debut against Brad Tavares on October 29, 2011 at UFC 137, replacing an injured Tim Credeur. However, Tavares himself was forced out of the bout with an injury and replaced by fellow newcomer Clifford Starks. Jacoby lost the fight via unanimous decision.

In his second UFC outing, Jacoby was submitted by Chris Camozzi via guillotine choke on January 28, 2012 at UFC on Fox 2. He was later released from the UFC, following an 0–2 run in the promotion.

Post-UFC career
Jacoby bounced back from his UFC stint with a pair of victories on the regional circuit. He knocked out Billy Johnson in 45 seconds at an Indiana-based Hoosier Fight Club event on June 2, 2012, followed by a doctor stoppage win over Tim Williams for the Cage Fury FC middleweight title.

World Series of Fighting
Jacoby made his WSOF debut at its inaugural event on November 3, 2012, losing to fellow UFC veteran David Branch via unanimous decision.

Bellator MMA
Jacoby stepped in as a replacement for an injured Marcus Sursa to face Muhammed Lawal on September 5, 2014 at Bellator 123. He lost the fight via technical knockout in the second round.

Jacoby faced John Salter on January 16, 2015 at Bellator 132. He lost the fight via submission in the second round.

After the loss to Salter, Jacoby decided to concentrate on his kickboxing career. He eventually returned to MMA in 2019 to participate in Sparta Combat League heavyweight tournament, which consisted of boxing, kickboxing and MMA bouts. Jacoby went on to win the tournament by beating Cody East in the final bout.

Dana White’s Contender Series
On August 4, 2020, Jacoby headlined Dana White's Contender Series Season 4 opening week against Ty Flores. He won the fight via unanimous decision and was subsequently awarded a UFC contract.

Return to UFC 
Jacoby faced Justin Ledet on October 31, 2020 at UFC Fight Night 181. He won the fight via TKO in the first round.

Jacoby faced Maxim Grishin on February 27, 2021 at UFC Fight Night 186. At the weigh-ins, Maxim Grishin weighed in at  210.5  pounds, four and a half pounds over the light heavyweight non-title fight limit of 206 pounds. His bout proceeded at a catchweight and Grishin was fined 30% of his individual purse, which went Dustin. Despite being knocked down twice, Jacoby won a close bout via unanimous decision.

Jacoby faced Ion Cuțelaba, replacing injured Devin Clark, on May 1, 2021 at UFC on ESPN: Reyes vs. Procházka. Cuțelaba dominated the first round, however Jacoby came back in the second and third rounds with the fight ending in a split draw. Prior to the bout, Jacoby signed a new four-fight contract with the UFC.

Jacoby was scheduled to face Askar Mozharov on August 28, 2021 at UFC on ESPN 30. However, Mazharov was removed from the event for undisclosed reasons and was replaced by Darren Stewart. Jacoby won the fight via technical knockout in round one.

Replacing Aleksa Camur, Jacoby faced John Allan on short notice on November 6, 2021 at UFC 268. Jacoby won the bout via unanimous decision.

Jacoby faced Michał Oleksiejczuk  on March 5, 2022 at UFC 272. He won the fight via unanimous decision.

Jacoby faced Da Un Jung on July 16, 2022, at UFC on ABC 3. He won the fight via knockout in the first round. This win earned Jacoby his first Performance of the Night bonus award.

Jacoby faced Khalil Rountree Jr.  on October 29, 2022 at UFC Fight Night 213. He lost the fight via split decision.

Jacoby is scheduled to face Azamat Murzakanov on April 15, 2023, at UFC on ESPN 44.

Championships and accomplishments

Kickboxing
2013 Road to Glory USA 95kg Tournament Winner
2015 Glory Middleweight (-85 kg/187.4 lb) Qualification Tournament Winner
2016 Glory Middleweight (-85 kg/187.4 lb) Contender Tournament Winner

Mixed martial arts
Cage Fury Fighting Championships
CFFC Middleweight Championship (One time)
Ultimate Fighting Championship
 Performance of the Night (One time)

Mixed martial arts record

|-
|Loss
|align=center|18–6–1
|Khalil Rountree Jr.
|Decision (split)
|UFC Fight Night: Kattar vs. Allen
|
|align=center|3
|align=center|5:00
|Las Vegas, Nevada, United States
|
|-
|Win
|align=center|18–5–1
|Da Un Jung
|KO (punch)
|UFC on ABC: Ortega vs. Rodríguez
|
|align=center|1
|align=center|3:13
|Elmont, New York, United States
|
|-
|Win
|align=center|17–5–1
|Michał Oleksiejczuk
|Decision (unanimous)
|UFC 272
|
|align=center|3
|align=center|5:00
|Las Vegas, Nevada, United States
|
|-
|Win
|align=center|16–5–1
|John Allan
|Decision (unanimous)
|UFC 268
|
|align=center|3
|align=center|5:00
|New York City, New York, United States
|
|-
|Win
|align=center|15–5–1
|Darren Stewart
|TKO (punches)
|UFC on ESPN: Barboza vs. Chikadze
|
|align=center|1
|align=center|3:04
|Las Vegas, Nevada, United States
|
|-
|Draw
|align=center|
|Ion Cuțelaba
|Draw (split)
|UFC on ESPN: Reyes vs. Procházka
|
|align=center|3
|align=center|5:00
|Las Vegas, Nevada, United States
|
|-
|Win
|align=center|14–5
|Maxim Grishin
|Decision (unanimous)
|UFC Fight Night: Rozenstruik vs. Gane
|
|align=center|3
|align=center|5:00
|Las Vegas, Nevada, United States
|
|-
|Win
|align=center|13–5
|Justin Ledet
|TKO (leg kicks and punches)
|UFC Fight Night: Hall vs. Silva
|
|align=center|1
|align=center|2:38
|Las Vegas, Nevada, United States
|
|-
|Win
|align=center|12–5
|Ty Flores
|Decision (unanimous)
|Dana White's Contender Series 27
|
|align=center|3
|align=center|5:00
|Las Vegas, Nevada, United States
|
|-
|Win
|align=center|11–5
|Cody East
|Decision (unanimous)
|SCL 74: King of Sparta Heavyweight Series
|
|align=center|3
|align=center|5:00
|Golden, Colorado, United States
|
|-
|Loss
|align=center|10–5
|John Salter
|Submission (rear-naked choke)
|Bellator 132
|
|align=center|2
|align=center|3:33
|Temecula, California, United States
|
|-
|Loss
|align=center|10–4
|Muhammed Lawal
|TKO (punches)
|Bellator 123
|
|align=center|2
|align=center|1:13
|Uncasville, Connecticut, United States
|
|-
|Win
|align=center|10–3
|Lucas Lopes
|TKO (head kick and punches)
|Titan FC 29
|
|align=center|1
|align=center|4:15
|Fayetteville, North Carolina, United States
|
|-
|Win
|align=center|9–3
|Andrew Sanchez
|Decision (split)
|CCCW: The Uprising
|
|align=center|3
|align=center|5:00
|Springfield, Illinois, United States
|
|-
|Loss
|align=center|8–3
|David Branch
|Decision (unanimous)
|WSOF 1
|
|align=center|3
|align=center|5:00
|Las Vegas, Nevada, United States
|
|-
|Win
|align=center|8–2
|Tim Williams
|TKO (doctor stoppage)
|Cage Fury FC 16
|
|align=center|1
|align=center|4:04
|Atlantic City, New Jersey, United States
|
|-
|Win
|align=center|7–2
|Billy Johnson
|KO (punch)
|Hoosier Fight Club 11
|
|align=center|1
|align=center|0:45
|Valparaiso, Indiana, United States
|
|-
|Loss
|align=center|6–2
|Chris Camozzi
|Submission (guillotine choke)
|UFC on Fox: Evans vs. Davis
|
|align=center|3
|align=center|1:08
|Chicago, Illinois, United States
|
|-
|Loss
|align=center|6–1
|Clifford Starks
|Decision (unanimous)
|UFC 137
|
|align=center|3
|align=center|5:00
|Las Vegas, Nevada, United States
|
|-
|Win
|align=center|6–0
|Billy Horne
|TKO (punches)
|AP: Riverfists 2011
|
|align=center|1
|align=center|0:37
|Cincinnati, Ohio, United States
|
|-
|Win
|align=center|5–0
|Ryan Sturdy
|TKO (doctor stoppage)
|XFO: Xtreme Fighting Organization 40
|
|align=center|2
|align=center|2:31
|Lakemoor, Illinois, United States
|
|-
|Win
|align=center|4–0
|Oscar Glover
|TKO (punches)
|CCCW: Fight Night 3
|
|align=center|1
|align=center|2:25
|St. Louis, Missouri, United States
|
|-
|Win
|align=center|3–0
|Ryan Braun
|Submission (triangle choke)
|Disorderly Conduct: St. Patty's Showdown
|
|align=center|1
|align=center|1:05
|Omaha, Nebraska, United States
|
|-
|Win
|align=center|2–0
|David Gaston
|TKO (punches)
|CCCW 6
|
|align=center|1
|align=center|0:54
|Springfield, Illinois, United States
|
|-
|Win
|align=center|1–0
|Dan McGlasson
|TKO (punches)
|CCCW
|
|align=center|1
|align=center|2:09
|St. Louis, Missouri, United States
|

Professional kickboxing record

Professional boxing record

References

External links

1988 births
Living people
American male mixed martial artists
American male kickboxers
People from Fort Morgan, Colorado
Glory kickboxers
People from Cass County, Illinois
Ultimate Fighting Championship male fighters
Middleweight mixed martial artists
Mixed martial artists utilizing kickboxing
Mixed martial artists utilizing boxing
Mixed martial artists utilizing wrestling
Light heavyweight kickboxers